McNaught or MacNaught or Macnaught is a Scottish surname deriving from MacNeachdan which is a Gaelic patronymic for the Pictish name Nechdan meaning 'Pure'. It was anglicised as Macnaughten and variations of the name have led to Macnaught and MacKnight (also Macknight and McKnight). The MacNaughts of Kilquhanty were a branch of the Clan Macnaghten. Notable people with the surname include:

 Anita McNaught (born 1965), British-New Zealand journalist and TV presenter
 Erin McNaught (born 1982), the 2006 Miss Australia
 Euphemia McNaught (1902–2002), Canadian painter
 Ian McNaught-Davis (fl 1950s-1980s), BBC TV presenter
 James McNaught (1870–1919), Scottish footballer, 1901 FA Cup winner with Tottenham.
 Jane Macnaught, producer of British TV soap Coronation Street
 John McNaught (1902–1970), Canadian radio broadcaster and writer
 John McNaught (1964–1997), Scottish footballer
 Johnny McNaught (1892–1972), Scottish footballer
 John Watson MacNaught (1904–1984), Canadian politician
 Judith McNaught (born 1944), American writer
 Ken McNaught (born 1955), Scottish footballer
 Kenneth McNaught (1918–1997), Canadian historian
 Robert H. McNaught (born 1956), Scottish-Australian astronomer
 William McNaught (1883-1953), English music critic and teacher, son of William Gray McNaught
 William McNaught (Glasgow) (1813–1881), engineer who compounded a beam engine
 William McNaught (Rochdale), (flourished 1840s-1870s), engineer of  Petrie and McNaught, who invented a variable cut off gear and governor for a Stationary steam engine
 William Gray McNaught (1849-1918), English music critic and teacher
 William Kirkpatrick McNaught (1845–1919), Canadian politician
 Willie McNaught (1922–1989), Scottish footballer (father of Ken)

See also
 3173 McNaught, asteroid discovered in 1981
 Numerous comets discovered by Robert H. McNaught
 Comet McNaught-Russell, comet
 130P/McNaught-Hughes, comet
 McNaught Syndicate, American newspaper syndicate founded 1922
 McKnight, a related surname

Anglicised Scottish Gaelic-language surnames